Amboli may refer to:

 Amboli, Mumbai, Maharashtra
 Amboli, Pune, Maharashtra
 Amboli, Sindhudurg, Maharashtra (Amboli hill station)
 Amboli, Belgaum, Karnataka
 Amboli, Dharwad, Karnataka